Polunin (feminine: Polunina) is a Russian-language surname. Notable people with the surname include: 

 Alexander Polunin (born 1997), Russian ice hockey player
  (1899–1933), captain of the Russian army, emigrant, accomplice in the murder of V.V. Vorovsky
 Alyona Polunina (born 1975), Russian filmmaker
 Andriy Polunin (born 1971), Ukrainian footballer
 Oleg Polunin (1914–1985), English botanist
 Sergei Polunin (born 1989), Ukrainian ballet dancer 
 Slava Polunin (born 1950), Russian clown
 Vladimir Polunin (1880–1957), Russian painter
 Zoya Polunina (born 1991), Russian ice hockey player